Sergey Rostovtsev (born 2 June 1997) is a Russian road and track cyclist, who most recently rode for UCI Continental team .

Major results

Track

2014
 1st  Scratch, UCI World Junior Championships
2015
 UEC European Junior Championships
1st  Team pursuit
3rd Omnium
 National Junior Championships
1st  Omnium
1st  Team pursuit
 3rd  Team pursuit, UCI World Junior Championships
2016
 1st  Madison (with Maksim Piskunov), UEC European Under-23 Championships
2017
 National Championships
1st  Madison (with Mamyr Stash)
1st  Scratch
1st  Omnium
 2nd  Madison (with Maxim Piskunov), UEC European Under-23 Championships
2020
 3rd  Elimination, UEC European Championships
2021
 1st  Elimination, UEC European Championships
 3rd  Elimination, UCI World Championships

Road

2015
 1st  Points classification, Trophée Centre Morbihan
 1st Stage 1 Peace Race Juniors
 2nd Time trial, National Junior Championships
2017
 5th Overall Five Rings of Moscow
1st Stage 3
2018
 6th ZLM Tour
 10th Overall Five Rings of Moscow
2021
 Five Rings of Moscow
1st Stages 3 & 4
 10th GP Mediterranean
2022
 4th Grand Prix Justiniano Hotels

References

External links

1997 births
Living people
Russian male cyclists
Russian track cyclists
Sportspeople from Tula, Russia
21st-century Russian people